Robyn Arianrhod (born circa 1951) is an Australian historian of science known for her works on the predecessors to Albert Einstein, on Émilie du Châtelet and Mary Somerville, and on Thomas Harriot.

Education
In the 1970s, Arianrhod left her honours program in mathematics to join a radical counterculture community, without electricity, running water, or communications. She returned to school, earned a bachelor's degree from Monash University in 1993, and a doctorate from Monash University in 2003. She remains affiliated with Monash University as an honorary research associate in the mathematical sciences.

Books
Arianrhod's first book, Einstein's Heroes: Imagining the World through the Language of Mathematics (University of Queensland Press and Oxford University Press, 2005)
has little to do with Albert Einstein himself. The titular heroes are James Clerk Maxwell, Michael Faraday, and Isaac Newton, and (although the book is broad-ranging in its outline of the development of physics) the central narrative is Maxwell's development of Maxwell's equations for electromagnetism. Einstein kept a portrait of Maxwell in his laboratory, and Maxwell in turn was inspired by Faraday and Newton. A broader goal of the book is to communicate the beauty of mathematics and the way that mathematical language has become central to modern physics.

Seduced by Logic: Émilie du Châtelet, Mary Somerville and the Newtonian Revolution (Oxford University Press, 2012) describes and compares the accomplishments and lives of two women of mathematics separated by a century, Émilie du Châtelet in 18th-century France, and Mary Somerville in 19th-century England. Both women are best known for their popularization of the works of others, Newton's Principia Mathematica for Du Châtelet and Pierre-Simon Laplace's Traité de mécanique céleste for Somerville, but they had many other accomplishments, and the book keeps their scientific work in the foreground. Her treatment of Somerville has been criticized for ignoring Kathryn Neeley's earlier work on Somerville, and  also criticizes the book for its anachronistic treatment of lines of research that have been superseded by modern physics and its imprecise referencing to its source material.

Her newest book is Thomas Harriot: A Life in Science (Oxford University Press, 2019). A biography of 16th-century English polymath Thomas Harriot, it also establishes Harriot's contributions to astronomy, optics, physics, cartography, ethnology, and linguistics, which until recently had been little known, in part because of Harriot's failure to publish his discoveries.

References

External links

Year of birth missing (living people)
Living people
21st-century Australian historians
21st-century Australian women writers
Australian women historians
Historians of science
Monash University alumni